The 2009 Vuelta a Castilla y León was the 24th edition of the Vuelta a Castilla y León road cycling stage race, started on 23 March in Paredes de Nava, and concluded on 27 March in Valladolid. The race was won by Levi Leipheimer.

Teams
Seventeen teams of up to eight riders started the race:

Stages

Stage 1
23 March 2009 – Paredes de Nava to Baltanás,

Stage 2
24 March 2009 – Palencia (ITT),

Stage 3
25 March 2009 – Sahagún to Estación Inv. De San Isiro,

Stage 4
26 March 2009 – Santa María Del Páramo to Galende-Laguna De Los Peces,

Stage 5
27 March 2009 – Benavente to Valladolid,

Final standings

Jersey progress

Withdrawals

References

External links
 

2009
2009 in Spanish road cycling